1,5-Diazabicyclo[4.3.0]non-5-ene (DBN) is a chemical compound with the formula CHN.  It is an amidine base used in organic synthesis.  A related compound with related functions is 1,8-diazabicyclo[5.4.0]undec-7-ene (DBU).  The relatively complex nature of the formal names for DBU and DBN (hence the common use of acronyms) reflects the fact that these compounds are bicyclic and contain several functional groups.

Synthesis
DBN could be synthesized in the following manner, similarly to DBU:

The synthetic procedure starts with a Michael addition of 2-pyrrolidone to acrylonitrile, followed by hydrogenation, and finally dehydration.

Uses

As a base in organic synthesis
Similar to many other organic bases, DBN could be employed for dehydrohalogenation reactions, base-catalyzed rearrangement reactions, as well as Aldol condensation. Several examples are shown below:
 Elimination:

Epimerization of penicillin derivatives, catalyzed by DBN:

 Aldol condensation:

DBN salt as an ionic liquid
The acetate salt of DBN is a room-temperature ionic liquid used for processing cellulose fibers by acting as a replacement for the unstable N-Methylmorpholine N-oxide used for making lyocell.

References

Amidines
Non-nucleophilic bases
Pyrrolopyrimidines